Calliopsis is a genus of panurgine bees in the family Andrenidae. There are over 80 described species distributed throughout the western hemisphere.

Description 
Calliopsis have yellow and black stripes, long legs and dark wings. Instead of having a long head like other bees, Calliopsis''' s heads are quite broad. Male Calliopsis have broad yellow stripes on their head, while females have narrow yellow stripes. The bees also have very distinctive long narrow wings and extra hairy thoraxes. Calliopsis andreniformis bees have green eyes, and males of the species have bright yellow faces and legs.

 Behavior 
Since Calliopsis has many different species, a lot of bees behave differently in different region. For example, Calliopsis hondurasicus become active at the start of the dry season in mid- to late-December, and activity ends in late January or early February. Males patrol areas where females emerge and later nest, and they defend territories to which they return repeatedly. Male-male contests involve a rapid spiraling-upward flight, often followed by physical aggression after the pair tumbles to the ground.

 Diet Calliopsis, like other bees, use their vision to locate food. They gather nectar and pollen from flowers. Most bees are vegetarian (but see vulture bee).

 Mating 
Male Calliopsis fly close to the ground and many of them copulate with a single female. Mating takes place on flowers and at nest sites. Calliopsis also are univoltine, which means they only have one brood of offspring a year.

Unlike the meiosis-based sex determination mechanisms of many animals, sex determination in Hymenoptera is clearly under control of the female through selective fertilization of eggs.

 Nesting 
Nearly all female Calliopsis are solitary nesters, but they dig nests within aggregations near other females. Nests are built in the form of horizontal tunnels connected to waterproofed chambers containing eggs and provisions stored by the mother bee. Each female of this genus digs a solitary underground nest, usually in compacted, dense soil and close to flowering plants that serve as food sources. Calliopsis nesting aggregations can be as dense as 1,650 nests/m^2.

The nest tunnels measure 7.5 mm maximum diameter and 13 mm long. Calliopsis bees build their nest the way they do to mitigate competition between males. Their nest is built for waterproof hazards to keep the soil dry until the ground evaporates. Although reported in a few other bee groups, Calliopsis are unusual in including aquatic nesters: Calliopsis pugionis emerged from nests that had been underwater for at least 3 months.

Species
These 88 species belong to the genus Calliopsis''.

References 

Andrenidae
Bee genera